Italy–Moldova relations refer to foreign relations between Moldova and Italy. Italy has an embassy in Chişinău.

History
In 1992 Italy was one of the first countries to recognize Moldova.

In 2014, Italy's foreign minister praised Moldova for choosing "the path of going toward the West but of also maintaining good relations with the East".

The current Italian ambassador to Moldova with residence in Bucharest is Daniele Mancini.

See also 
 Foreign relations of Italy
 Foreign relations of Moldova
 Moldova–EU relations
 Accession of Moldova to the European Union

References

External links 
 Italian Embassy, Chişinău
 Ministry of Foreign Affairs of the Republic of Moldova
 Italian Ministry of Foreign Affairs 
 Diplomatic Relations . Ministry of Foreign Affairs and European Integration of the Republic of Moldova.

 
Moldova
Bilateral relations of Moldova